The Boys' Youth European Volleyball Championship is a volleyball competition for men's national teams with players under the age of 18 years, currently held biannually and organized by the European Volleyball Confederation, the volleyball federation for Europe. Originally the age limit was 19; as of the 2018 edition, the competition age limit was changed from 19 to 18 and the name to U18 European Championship.

Results summary

Medal summary

Participating nations

References

Sources
Home page
CEV Boys Youth Volleyball European Championship – Competition History

 
Boys U18
Volleyball
European volleyball records and statistics
1995 establishments in Europe